The 1998 British Empire Trophy was the second round of the 1998 FIA GT Championship. It took place at the Silverstone Circuit, United Kingdom on 17 May 1998.

Official results
Class winners are in bold.  Cars failing to complete 70% of winner's distance are marked as Not Classified (NC).

Statistics
 Pole position – #7 Porsche AG – 1:39.703
 Fastest lap – #8 Porsche AG – 1:42.719
 Average speed – 173.231 km/h

References

 
 
 

S
Silverstone 500